Barakhata Union is a union parishad of Hatibandha Upazila in the District and Division of Rangpur, Bangladesh

References

Populated places in Lalmonirhat district
Unions of Lalmonirhat District